Async Corp. is an iOS game developed by American studio Powerhead Games and released on June 28, 2011.

Critical reception
The game has a Metacritic rating of 85% based on 6 critic reviews.

References

2011 video games
IOS games
IOS-only games
Puzzle video games
Video games developed in the United States